Ismail Katamba (born ) is a Ugandan male weightlifter, competing in the 62 kg category and representing Uganda at international competitions. He competed at world championships, most recently at the 2005 World Weightlifting Championships.

Major results

References

1987 births
Living people
Ugandan male weightlifters
Place of birth missing (living people)
Weightlifters at the 2006 Commonwealth Games
Weightlifters at the 2010 Commonwealth Games
Commonwealth Games competitors for Uganda